The Well-Digger's Daughter is a 2011 French Romantic Drama film. Daniel Auteuil makes his directorial debut as he stars alongside Àstrid Bergès-Frisbey, Kad Merad, Sabine Azéma, Jean-Pierre Darroussin, and Nicolas Duvauchelle.

The screenplay by Auteuil is based on the 1940 film The Well-Digger's Daughter written and directed by Marcel Pagnol.

Plot
Jacques Mazel, a 26 year-old pilot in the French Air Force and the only child of a wealthy shopkeeper, is fishing in a stream near his parents' home. On the bank appears 18 year-old Patricia Amoretti, eldest daughter of a widowed well-digger, who is taking lunch to her father, Pascal, and his employee, Félipe. Jacques carries her across the stream and, after seeing her again at an air display the next day, takes her for a ride on his motorbike. On their way home, they stop in a field to make love. Later that night, Jacques is called to his unit, so, unable to keep a rendezvous with Patricia in the morning, he asks his mother to deliver a letter. She, not approving his choice of company, burns the letter.

Patricia, who concludes that Jacques has rejected her because they are from different social classes, discovers that she is pregnant. Confronted by Pascal, the parents of Jacques reject the idea that their son conceived a child out of wedlock and refuse to acknowledge the expected baby. To spare his five other daughters from the social opprobrium of an illegitimate child in the family, Pascal sends Patricia to have her baby with his sister in another village.

News arrives that Jacques is missing, his plane having gone down in flames behind German lines. Félipe offers to marry Patricia, but she declines, partly because her younger sister Amanda has a crush on Felipe. Grieving over the loss of their son, the Mazels offer to take some responsibility for their newborn grandson, but Pascal obstinately rejects their offer.

Jacques returns home, having escaped through neutral Switzerland, and learns that he has a son. His overjoyed parents call on Pascal to ask if he will forgive them and allow a marriage. He agrees if the couple agree. As their love is as strong as when they first met, the film ends happily.

Cast
Daniel Auteuil as Pascal Amoretti, the well-digger
Àstrid Bergès-Frisbey as Patricia Amoretti, his eldest daughter
Kad Merad as Félipe Rambert, his employee
Jean-Pierre Darroussin as Monsieur Mazel, the shopkeeper
Sabine Azéma as Madame Mazel, his wife
Nicolas Duvauchelle as Jacques Mazel, their son
Marie-Anne Chazel as Nathalie, Pascal's sister
Émilie Cazenave as Amanda Amoretti, Pascal's second daughter

Production
The original music score was composed by Alexandre Desplat and features Enrico Caruso's rendition of "Core 'ngrato".

Critical response
On the review aggregator website Rotten Tomatoes, the film has an approval rating of 90%, based on 39 reviews, with an average rating of 7.4/10. On Metacritic, the film has a weighted average score of 67 out of 100, based on 17 critics, indicating "generally favorable reviews".

References

External links
 
 
 
 

2011 films
Remakes of French films
Films based on works by Marcel Pagnol
Films set in France
2010s French-language films
2011 romantic comedy-drama films
French romantic comedy-drama films
Films scored by Alexandre Desplat
Films set in the 1910s
Films directed by Daniel Auteuil
2011 directorial debut films
2010s French films
French pregnancy films
2010s pregnancy films